A Bleeding Heart is an EP by New Zealand band the Bleeders, released in 2003.

Track listing
"Intro"
"Channeling"
"Sell Out"
"Cast in the Shadows"
"All That Glitters"
"It's Black"
"A Bleeding Heart"

Australian release
The EP was repackaged and re-released in Australia in 2005. It was renamed to The Bleeders. It was put out as an introduction to the band in Australia. It was also put out to coincide with their Australian shows at the time.

Personnel
Angelo Munro – vocals
Ian King – guitar/backing vocals
Hadleigh Donald – guitar/backing vocals
Gareth	Stack – bass/backing vocals
Matt Clark – drums/backing vocals

Bleeders albums
2003 EPs